Parnassius andreji  is a snow butterfly found in China. The species was first described by Curt Eisner in 1930.

Parnassius andreji was described as a subspecies of Parnassius simo. It is now treated as a full species occurring sympatrically with Parnassius simo.

References
 Weiss, J.-C. 1991. The Parnassiinae of the World - Part 1. Sciences Nat, Venette; 48 pp.
Chou, I. (ed) 1994. Monographia Rhopalocerorum Sinensium (Monograph of Chinese Butterflies) [in Chinese]. Henan Scientific and Technological Publishing House, [Zhengzhou]; 2 vols., viii, 855 pp.
 Koiwaya, S. 1995. Re-assortment of Parnassius simo and andreji - On the discovery of sympatric habitat of P. simo and P. andreji, with the description of new ssp. of andreji. Gekkan-Mushi, 297: 8-13.

Further reading
 Swedish Wikipedia provides further references and synonymy

External links
"Kreizbergius andreji Eisner, 1930". Insecta.pro.
"Parnassius andreji andreji". The Insects from the Palaearctic Region.

Butterflies described in 1930
andreji